Verkhny Atash (Ürge Ataş) is a rural locality (a selo) in Chekmagushevsky District, Bashkortostan, Russia. The population was 474 as of 2010. There are 11 streets.

Geography 
Verkhny Atash is located 26 km north of Chekmagush (the district's administrative centre) by road. Nizhneatashevo is the nearest rural locality.

References 

Rural localities in Chekmagushevsky District